Gerard Kuppen (6 February 1915 – 23 September 1995) was a Dutch footballer. He played in three matches for the Netherlands national football team from 1937 to 1946.

References

External links
 

1915 births
1995 deaths
Dutch footballers
Netherlands international footballers
Place of birth missing
Association footballers not categorized by position